John Hilton (born 22 May 1792) was an English cricketer who was associated with Nottingham Cricket Club and made his first-class debut in 1829.

References

1792 births
Year of death unknown
English cricketers
English cricketers of 1826 to 1863
Nottingham Cricket Club cricketers